Matricaria suaveolens may refer to:

 Matricaria suaveolens L. = Matricaria chamomilla L.
 Matricaria suaveolens (Pursh) Buchenau, non L. = Matricaria discoidea DC.